Harvey William Burk (1822 in Darlington Township, Upper Canada – October 13, 1907) was a politician and farmer.

Burk was educated in Darlington Township. He was married twice: to Roley Williams in 1848 and to Susan Armour in 1859. He operated a farm near Bowmanville. Burk served on the township council and was reeve from 1873 to 1874. He was elected to the House of Commons of Canada as a Member the Liberal Party to represent Durham West in 1874. He won a landslide victory in 1878. Burk resigned October 18, 1879 to allow Edward Blake to be elected.

His daughter Mary Emily married Sam Hughes.

References 

1822 births
1907 deaths
Liberal Party of Canada MPs
Members of the House of Commons of Canada from Ontario
People from Clarington